Satu Tuominen (born 19 November 1985) is a Finnish retired ice hockey player. She played in more than 110 international matches with the Finnish national team, including three IIHF World Women's Championship tournaments and the women's ice hockey tournament at the 2006 Winter Olympics. With the Finnish national team, she won IIHF Worlds bronze medals in 2004 and 2009.

References

External links
 
 

1985 births
Living people
Sportspeople from Vantaa
Finnish women's ice hockey forwards
Olympic ice hockey players of Finland
Ice hockey players at the 2006 Winter Olympics
Espoo Blues Naiset players
Team Kuortane players